The 2001 Asian Fencing Championships were held in Bangkok, Thailand from 4 August to 9 August 2001.

Medal summary

Men

Women

Medal table

References

FIE Magazine
Individual Results
Team Results

External links
Official website

Asian Championship
F
Asian Fencing Championships
International fencing competitions hosted by Thailand